is a 1994 Japanese pink film written and directed by Hiroyuki Oki, depicting gay life in Japan. It won the Silver Prize at the 1994 Pink Grand Prix ceremony. Filmmaker/actor Hiroyuki Oki was also given a Best New Director award for the film.

Cast
Chano
Hisanori Kitakaze
Naoya Matsumae
Kazufumi Nishimoto
Hiroyuki Oki
Kazunori Shibuya
Tomoko Taka
Yoji Tanaka

References

External links
 

 
 

1994 films
1990s Japanese-language films
Pink films
Japanese LGBT-related films
1994 drama films
LGBT-related drama films
1994 LGBT-related films
Gay-related films
1990s Japanese films